Astragalus californicus is a species of milkvetch known by the common name Klamath Basin milkvetch.

It is native to the Klamath Mountains and surrounding High Cascade Ranges of northern California and southern Oregon, where it grows in scrub and woodland habitat.

Description
The leaves are several centimeters long and made up of green leaflike leaflets.

The inflorescence is a loose array of light yellow to cream-colored pealike flowers, each between 1 and 2 centimeters long.

The fruit is a hanging legume pod 3 or 4 centimeters long. It is flat and narrow, with a hairy surface, and it dries to a thick papery texture.

External links
Jepson Manual Treatment
The Nature Conservancy
USDA Plants Profile
Photo gallery

californicus
Flora of California
Flora of Oregon
Flora of the Cascade Range
Flora of the Klamath Mountains
Plants described in 1876